Carman/Friendship Field Airport  is located adjacent to Carman, Manitoba, Canada.

References

External links
Page about this airport on COPA's Places to Fly airport directory

Registered aerodromes in Manitoba